Ahmedpur Mandvi Beach is located on the coastline of the state of Gujarat, India. It is located in Ahmedpur Mandvi, near Diu (Union Territory of Daman and Diu) in Gir Somnath District. This is 370 km away from Ahmedabad. and is one of the 14 beaches chosen by the state to promote beach tourism.

See also
 List of beaches in India

References

External links
 Ahmedpur Mandvi Beach 

Beaches of Gujarat
Tourist attractions in Junagadh district